Jim Davidson (born January 18, 1963) is an American actor and model active in the 1990s and early 2000s. Davidson is a graduate of Lehigh University. He starred in the 2003 film Disaster (also known as Cult of Fury) as Roger Goodwin.

Career
He graduated from Selinsgrove High School in Snyder County, Pennsylvania, United States . Jim earned his Bachelor of Science from Lehigh University in Bethlehem, Pennsylvania. He worked as a public accountant for PricewaterhouseCoopers in New York City before he was discovered by a model agency.

Davidson's first television role came as the pit reporter on the monster truck racing series Monster Wars, which lasted one season in 1993 before being cancelled. He is best known for his work on the mid-1990s television drama Pacific Blue. Since then, Davidson has guest-starred in a number of prime time dramas and appeared on CBS's Soap Guiding Light from 2001 to 2002 and 2005. In 2003, he starred as Roger Goodwin in the film Disaster. 

A television pilot based on the Snopes.com website, called Snopes: Urban Legends, was completed in 2002 with Davidson as host, but major networks passed on the project.

Filmography

References

External links 
 

1963 births
Living people
Lehigh University alumni
American male television actors
Male models from Pennsylvania
American accountants
Male actors from Pennsylvania
People from Union County, Pennsylvania
American male soap opera actors
People from Selinsgrove, Pennsylvania